Sant'Arcangelo Trimonte is a comune (municipality) in the Province of Benevento in the Italian region Campania, located about 70 km northeast of Naples and about 13 km east of Benevento.

Sant'Arcangelo Trimonte was part of Province of Avellino until 1978; its territory borders the following municipalities: Apice, Buonalbergo, Paduli.

References

Cities and towns in Campania